Thryptomene decussata is a species of flowering plant in the family Myrtaceae and is endemic to Western Australia. It is an erect shrub with upward pointing, egg-shaped leaves, and white or pink flowers with five petals and twenty to thirty stamens in two whorls.

Description
Flowering occurs from May to November.

Taxonomy
This species was first formally described in 1904 by William Vincent Fitzgerald who gave it the name Scholtzia decussata in the Journal of the West Australian Natural History Society. In 1985, John Green changed the name to Thryptomene decussata. The specific epithet (decussata) refers to the decussate arrangement of the leaves.

Distribution and habitat
This thryptomene is widely distributed from near Shark Bay to near Leonora, growing on sand plains, breakaways and on stony ridges in the Coolgardie, Gascoyne, Murchison and Yalgoo biogeographic regions.

Conservation status
Thryptomene decussata is classified as "not threatened" by the Western Australian Government Department of Parks and Wildlife.

References

decussata
Rosids of Western Australia
Plants described in 1904
Taxa named by William Vincent Fitzgerald